Change Remains is the fourth and final studio album by the indie pop band Starlight Mints.

Track listing
 "Coffins 'r' Us" – 1:49
 "Natural" – 2:41
 "Paralyzed" – 3:50
 "Zoomba" – 3:34
 "Black Champagne" – 3:24
 "Power Bleed" – 3:25
 "Gazeretti" – 2:48
 "Sesame (Untie The Wrath)" – 3:49
 "Snorkel With A Turtle" – 1:53
 "40 Fingers" – 3:46

2009 albums
Starlight Mints albums